Athlete Refugee Team competed at the 2017 World Championships in Athletics in London, United Kingdom, 4–13 August 2017.

Results

Men
Track and road events

Women
Track and road events

See also

Independent Paralympic Athletes at the 2016 Summer Paralympics
Refugee Olympic Team at the 2016 Summer Olympics

References

Independent athletes
Athlete Refugee Team at the World Athletics Championships